Samruay Charonggool (born 3 July 1944) is a former Thai sprinter. She competed in the women's 400 metres at the 1964 Summer Olympics.

References

1944 births
Living people
Athletes (track and field) at the 1964 Summer Olympics
Samruay Charonggool
Samruay Charonggool
Place of birth missing (living people)
Olympic female sprinters